The division of Korea began with the defeat of Japan in World War II. During the war, the Allied leaders considered the question of Korea's future after Japan's surrender in the war. The leaders reached an understanding that Korea would be liberated from Japan but would be placed under an international trusteeship until the Koreans would be deemed ready for self-rule. In the last days of the war, the U.S. proposed dividing the Korean peninsula into two occupation zones (a U.S. and Soviet one) with the 38th parallel as the dividing line. The Soviets accepted their proposal and agreed to divide Korea.

It was understood that this division was only a temporary arrangement until the trusteeship could be implemented. In December 1945, the Moscow Conference of Foreign Ministers resulted in an agreement on a five-year four-power Korean trusteeship. However, with the onset of the Cold War and other factors both international and domestic, including Korean opposition to the trusteeship, negotiations between the United States and the Soviet Union over the next two years regarding the implementation of the trusteeship failed, thus effectively nullifying the only agreed-upon framework for the re-establishment of an independent and unified Korean state. With this, the Korean question was referred to the United Nations. In 1948, after the UN failed to produce an outcome acceptable to the Soviet Union, UN-supervised elections were held in the US-occupied south only. The American-backed Syngman Rhee won the election, while Kim Il-sung consolidated his position as the leader of Soviet-occupied northern Korea. This led to the establishment of the Republic of Korea in southern Korea on 15 August 1948, promptly followed by the establishment of the Democratic People's Republic of Korea in northern Korea on 9 September 1948. The United States supported the South, the Soviet Union supported the North, and each government claimed sovereignty over the whole Korean peninsula.

In 1950, after years of mutual hostilities, North Korea invaded South Korea in an attempt to re-unify the peninsula under its communist rule. The subsequent Korean War, which lasted from 1950 to 1953, ended with a stalemate and has left Korea divided by the Korean Demilitarized Zone (DMZ) up to the present day.

On 27 April 2018, during the 2018 inter-Korean summit, the Panmunjom Declaration for Peace, Prosperity and Reunification of the Korean Peninsula was adopted between Kim Jong-un, the Supreme Leader of North Korea, and Moon Jae-in, the President of South Korea. Later that same year, following the September inter-Korean summit, several actions were taken toward reunification along the border, such as the dismantling of guard posts and the creation of buffer zones to prevent clashes. On 12 December 2018, soldiers from both Koreas crossed the Military Demarcation Line (MDL) into the opposition countries for the first time in history.

Historical background

Japanese rule (1910–1945)

When the Russo-Japanese War ended in 1905 Korea became a nominal protectorate of Japan, and was annexed by Japan in 1910. The Korean Emperor Gojong was removed. In the following decades, nationalist and radical groups emerged to struggle for independence. Divergent in their outlooks and approaches, these groups failed to come together in one national movement. The Korean Provisional Government in exile in China failed to obtain widespread recognition.

World War II

At the Cairo Conference in November 1943, in the middle of World War II, Franklin D. Roosevelt, Winston Churchill and Chiang Kai-shek agreed that Japan should lose all the territories it had conquered by force. At the end of the conference, the three powers declared that they were, "mindful of the enslavement of the people of Korea, ... determined that in due course Korea shall become free and independent." Roosevelt floated the idea of a trusteeship over Korea, but did not obtain agreement from the other powers. Roosevelt raised the idea with Joseph Stalin at the Tehran Conference in November 1943 and the Yalta Conference in February 1945. Stalin did not disagree, but advocated that the period of trusteeship be short.

At the Tehran and Yalta Conferences, Stalin promised to join his allies in the Pacific War in two to three months after victory in Europe. On 8 August 1945, two days after the first atomic bomb was dropped on Hiroshima, but before the second bomb was dropped at Nagasaki, the USSR declared war on Japan. As war began, the Commander-in-Chief of Soviet Forces in the Far East, Marshal Aleksandr Vasilevsky, called on Koreans to rise up against Japan, saying "a banner of liberty and independence is rising in Seoul".

Soviet troops advanced rapidly, and the US government became anxious that they would occupy the whole of Korea. On 10 August 1945 two young officers – Dean Rusk and Charles Bonesteel – were assigned to define an American occupation zone. Working on extremely short notice and completely unprepared, they used a National Geographic map to decide on the 38th parallel as the dividing line. They chose it because it divided the country approximately in half but would place the capital Seoul under American control. No experts on Korea were consulted. The two men were unaware that forty years before, Japan and pre-revolutionary Russia had discussed sharing Korea along the same parallel. Rusk later said that had he known, he "almost surely" would have chosen a different line. The division placed sixteen million Koreans in the American zone and nine million in the Soviet zone. Rusk observed, "even though it was further north than could be realistically reached by US forces, in the event of Soviet disagreement ... we felt it important to include the capital of Korea in the area of responsibility of American troops". He noted that he was "faced with the scarcity of US forces immediately available, and time and space factors, which would make it difficult to reach very far north, before Soviet troops could enter the area". To the surprise of the Americans, the Soviet Union immediately accepted the division. The agreement was incorporated into General Order No. 1 (approved on 17 August 1945) for the surrender of Japan.

Soviet forces began amphibious landings in Korea by 14 August and rapidly took over the north-east of the country, and on 16 August they landed at Wonsan. On 24 August, the Red Army reached Pyongyang, the second largest city in the Korean Peninsula after Seoul.

General Nobuyuki Abe, the last Japanese Governor-General of Korea, had established contact with a number of influential Koreans since the beginning of August 1945 to prepare the hand-over of power. On 6 September 1945, a congress of representatives was convened in Seoul and founded the short-lived People's Republic of Korea. In the spirit of consensus, conservative elder statesman Syngman Rhee, who was living in exile in the US, was nominated as president.

Post–World War II

Division (since 2 September 1945)

Soviet occupation of northern Korea

When Soviet troops entered Pyongyang, they found a local branch of the Committee for the Preparation of Korean Independence operating under the leadership of veteran nationalist Cho Man-sik. The Soviet Army allowed these "People's Committees" (which were friendly to the Soviet Union) to function. In September 1945, the Soviet administration issued its own currency, the "Red Army won". In 1946, Colonel-General Terentii Shtykov took charge of the administration and began to lobby the Soviet government for funds to support the ailing economy.

In February 1946 a provisional government called the Provisional People's Committee was formed under Kim Il-sung, who had spent the last years of the war training with Soviet troops in Manchuria. Conflicts and power struggles ensued at the top levels of government in Pyongyang as different aspirants manoeuvred to gain positions of power in the new government. In March 1946 the provisional government instituted a sweeping land-reform program: land belonging to Japanese and collaborator landowners was divided and redistributed to poor farmers. Organizing the many poor civilians and agricultural labourers under the people's committees, a nationwide mass campaign broke the control of the old landed classes. Landlords were allowed to keep only the same amount of land as poor civilians who had once rented their land, thereby making for a far more equal distribution of land. The North Korean land reform was achieved in a less violent way than in China or in Vietnam. Official American sources stated: "From all accounts, the former village leaders were eliminated as a political force without resort to bloodshed, but extreme care was taken to preclude their return to power." The farmers responded positively; many collaborators, former landowners and Christians fled to the south, where some of them obtained positions in the new South Korean government. According to the U.S. military government, 400,000 northern Koreans went south as refugees.

Key industries were nationalized. The economic situation was nearly as difficult in the north as it was in the south, as the Japanese had concentrated agriculture and service industries in the south and heavy industry in the north.

Soviet forces departed in 1948.

US occupation of southern Korea

With the American government fearing Soviet expansion, and the Japanese authorities in Korea warning of a power vacuum, the embarkation date of the US occupation force was brought forward three times. On 7 September 1945, General Douglas MacArthur issued Proclamation No. 1 to the people of Korea, announcing U.S. military control over Korea south of the 38th parallel and establishing English as the official language during military control. That same day, he announced that Lieutenant General John R. Hodge was to administer Korean affairs. Hodge landed in Incheon with his troops on 8 September 1945.

MacArthur as Supreme Commander for the Allied Powers ended up being in charge of southern Korea from 1945 to 1948 due to the lack of clear orders or initiative from Washington, D.C. There was no plan or guideline given to MacArthur from the Joint Chiefs of Staff or the State Department on how to rule Korea. Hodge directly reported to MacArthur and GHQ (General Headquarters) in Tokyo, not to Washington, D.C., during the military occupation. The three year period of the U.S. Army occupation was chaotic and tumultuous compared to the very peaceful and stable U.S. occupation of Japan from 1945 to 1952. Hodge and his XXIV Corps were trained for combat, not for diplomacy and negotiating with the many diverse political groups that emerged in post-colonial southern Korea: former Japanese collaborators, pro-Soviet communists, anti-Soviet communists, right wing groups, and Korean nationalists. None of the Americans in the military or the State Department in the Far East in late 1945 even spoke Korean, leading to local Koreans joking about how Korean translators were really running southern Korea. The Provisional Government of the Republic of Korea, which had operated from China, sent a delegation with three interpreters to Hodge, but he refused to meet with them. Likewise, Hodge refused to recognize the newly formed People's Republic of Korea and its People's Committees, and outlawed it on 12 December.

Japanese civilians were repatriated, including nearly all industrial managers and technicians; over 500,000 by December 1945 and 786,000 by August 1946. Severe price inflation occurred in the disrupted economy, until in summer 1946 rationing and price controls were imposed.

In September 1946, thousands of laborers and peasants rose up against the military government. This uprising was quickly defeated, and failed to prevent scheduled October elections for the South Korean Interim Legislative Assembly. The opening of the Assembly was delayed to December to investigate widespread allegations of electoral fraud.

Ardent anti-communist Syngman Rhee, who had been the first president of the Provisional Government and later worked as a pro-Korean lobbyist in the US, became the most prominent politician in the South. Rhee pressured the American government to abandon negotiations for a trusteeship and create an independent Republic of Korea in the south. On 19 July 1947, Lyuh Woon-hyung, the last senior politician committed to left-right dialogue, was assassinated by a 19-year-old man named Han Chigeun, a recent refugee from North Korea and an active member of a nationalist right-wing group.

The occupation government and then the newly formed South Korean government conducted a number of military campaigns against left-wing insurgents. Over the course of the next few years, between 30,000 and 100,000 people were killed. Most casualties resulted from the Jeju Uprising.

US–Soviet Joint Commission
In December 1945, at the Moscow Conference, the Allies agreed that the Soviet Union, the US, the Republic of China, and Britain would take part in a trusteeship over Korea for up to five years in the lead-up to independence. Many Koreans demanded independence immediately; however, the Korean Communist Party, which was closely aligned with the Soviet Communist party, supported the trusteeship. According to historian Fyodor Tertitskiy, documentation from 1945 suggests the Soviet government initially had no plans for a permanent division.

A  met in 1946 and 1947 to work towards a unified administration, but failed to make progress due to increasing Cold War antagonism and to Korean opposition to the trusteeship. In 1946, the Soviet Union proposed Lyuh Woon-hyung as the leader of a unified Korea, but this was rejected by the US. Meanwhile, the division between the two zones deepened. The difference in policy between the occupying powers led to a polarization of politics, and a transfer of population between North and South. In May 1946 it was made illegal to cross the 38th parallel without a permit. At the final meeting of the Joint Commission in September 1947, Soviet delegate Terentii Shtykov proposed that both Soviet and US troops withdraw and give the Korean people the opportunity to form their own government. This was rejected by the US.

UN intervention and the formation of separate governments

With the failure of the Joint Commission to make progress, the US brought the problem before the United Nations in September 1947. The Soviet Union opposed UN involvement. The UN passed a resolution on 14 November 1947, declaring that free elections should be held, foreign troops should be withdrawn, and a UN commission for Korea, the United Nations Temporary Commission on Korea (UNTCOK), should be created. The Soviet Union boycotted the voting and did not consider the resolution to be binding, arguing that the UN could not guarantee fair elections. In the absence of Soviet co-operation, it was decided to hold UN-supervised elections in the south only. This was in defiance of the report of the chairman of the commission, K. P. S. Menon, who had argued against a separate election. Some UNTCOK delegates felt that the conditions in the south gave unfair advantage to right-wing candidates, but they were overruled.

The decision to proceed with separate elections was unpopular among many Koreans, who rightly saw it as a prelude to a permanent division of the country. General strikes in protest against the decision began in February 1948. In April, Jeju islanders rose up against the looming division of the country. South Korean troops were sent to repress the rebellion. Tens of thousands of islanders were killed and by one estimate, 70% of the villages were burned by the South Korean troops. The uprising flared up again with the outbreak of the Korean War.

In April 1948, a conference of organizations from the north and the south met in Pyongyang. The southern politicians Kim Koo and Kim Kyu-sik attended the conference and boycotted the elections in the south, as did other politicians and parties. The conference called for a united government and the withdrawal of foreign troops. Syngman Rhee and General Hodge denounced the conference. Kim Koo was assassinated the following year.

On 10 May 1948 the south held a general election. It took place amid widespread violence and intimidation, as well as a boycott by opponents of Syngman Rhee. On 15 August, the "Republic of Korea" (Daehan Minguk) formally took over power from the U.S. military, with Syngman Rhee as the first president. In the North, the "Democratic People's Republic of Korea" (Chosŏn Minjujuŭi Inmin Konghwaguk) was declared on 9 September, with Kim Il-sung as prime minister.

On 12 December 1948, the United Nations General Assembly accepted the report of UNTCOK and declared the Republic of Korea to be the "only lawful government in Korea". However, none of the members of UNTCOK considered that the election had established a legitimate national parliament. The Australian government, which had a representative on the commission declared that it was "far from satisfied" with the election.

Unrest continued in the South. In October 1948, the Yeosu–Suncheon rebellion took place, in which some regiments rejected the suppression of the Jeju uprising and rebelled against the government. In 1949, the Syngman Rhee government established the Bodo League in order to keep an eye on its political opponents. The majority of the Bodo League's members were innocent farmers and civilians who were forced into membership. The registered members or their families were executed at the beginning of the Korean War. On 24 December 1949, South Korean Army massacred Mungyeong citizens who were suspected communist sympathizers or their family and affixed blame to communists.

Korean War

This division of Korea, after more than a millennium of being unified, was seen as controversial and temporary by both regimes. From 1948 until the start of the civil war on 25 June 1950, the armed forces of each side engaged in a series of bloody conflicts along the border. In 1950, these conflicts escalated dramatically when North Korean forces invaded South Korea, triggering the Korean War. The United Nations intervened to protect the South, sending a US-led force. As it occupied the south, the Democratic People's Republic of Korea attempted to unify Korea under its regime, initiating the nationalisation of industry, land reform, and the restoration of the People's Committees.

While UN intervention was conceived as restoring the border at the 38th parallel, Syngman Rhee argued that the attack of the North had obliterated the boundary. Similarly UN Commander in Chief, General Douglas MacArthur stated that he intended to unify Korea, not just drive the North Korean forces back behind the border. However, the North overran 90% of the south until a counter-attack by US-led forces. As the North Korean forces were driven from the south, South Korean forces crossed the 38th parallel on 1 October, and American and other UN forces followed a week later. This was despite warnings from the People's Republic of China that it would intervene if American troops crossed the parallel. As it occupied the north, the Republic of Korea, in turn, attempted to unify the country under its regime, with the Korean National Police enforcing political indoctrination. As US-led forces pushed into the north, China unleashed a counter-attack which drove them back into the south.

In 1951, the front line stabilized near the 38th parallel, and both sides began to consider an armistice. Rhee, however, demanded the war continue until Korea was unified under his leadership. The Communist side supported an armistice line being based on the 38th parallel, but the United Nations supported a line based on the territory held by each side, which was militarily defensible. The UN position, formulated by the Americans, went against the consensus leading up to the negotiations. Initially, the Americans proposed a line that passed through Pyongyang, far to the north of the front line. The Chinese and North Koreans eventually agreed to a border on the military line of contact rather than the 38th parallel, but this disagreement led to a tortuous and drawn-out negotiating process.

Armistice

The Korean Armistice Agreement was signed after three years of war. The two sides agreed to create a  buffer zone between the states, known as the Korean Demilitarized Zone (DMZ). This new border, reflecting the territory held by each side at the end of the war, crossed the 38th parallel diagonally. Rhee refused to accept the armistice and continued to urge the reunification of the country by force. Despite attempts by both sides to reunify the country, the war perpetuated the division of Korea and led to a permanent alliance between South Korea and the U.S., and a permanent U.S. garrison in the South.

As dictated by the terms of the Korean Armistice, a Geneva Conference was held in 1954 on the Korean question. Despite efforts by many of the nations involved, the conference ended without a declaration for a unified Korea.

The Armistice established a Neutral Nations Supervisory Commission (NNSC) which was tasked to monitor the Armistice. Since 1953, members of the Swiss and Swedish armed forces have been members of the NNSC stationed near the DMZ. Poland and Czechoslovakia were the neutral nations chosen by North Korea, but North Korea expelled their observers after those countries embraced capitalism.

Post-armistice relations

Since the war, Korea has remained divided along the DMZ. North and South have remained in a state of conflict, with the opposing regimes both claiming to be the legitimate government of the whole country. Sporadic negotiations have failed to produce lasting progress towards reunification.

On 27 April 2018 North Korean leader Kim Jong-un and South Korean President Moon Jae-in met in the Demilitarized Zone (DMZ). The Panmunjom Declaration signed by both leaders called for the end of longstanding military activities near the border and the reunification of Korea.

On 1 November 2018, buffer zones were established across the DMZ to help ensure the end of hostility on land, sea and air. The buffer zones stretch from the north of Deokjeok Island to the south of Cho Island in the West Sea and the north of Sokcho city and south of Tongchon County in the East (Yellow) Sea. In addition, no fly zones were established.

In popular culture

Period dramas
Eyes of Dawn (1991-1992 MBC television series)
Rustic Period (2002-2003 SBS television series)
Seoul 1945 (2006 KBS1 television series)

See also

 List of border incidents involving North and South Korea
 Korean conflict
 Korean reunification
 North Korea–South Korea relations
 History of North Korea
 History of South Korea
 Partition of Vietnam

References

Further reading
 Fields, David. Foreign Friends: Syngman Rhee, American Exceptionalism, and the Division of Korea. University Press of Kentucky, 2019, 264 pages, 
 
 Lee, Jongsoo. The Partition of Korea After World War II: A Global History. Palgrave Macmillan, 2006, 220 pages, 
 Oberdorfer, Don. The Two Koreas : A Contemporary History. Addison-Wesley, 1997, 472 pages,

External links
 South Korean Ministry of Unification (Korean and English)
 North Korean News Agency  (Korean and English)
 Korea Web Weekly (English)
 NDFSK (Mostly Korean; some English)
 Koreascope (Korean and English)
 Rulers.org, has list of Post-World War II US and Soviet administrators (English)
 Korean Unification Studies

History of Korea
History of North Korea
History of South Korea
North Korea–South Korea relations
Territorial disputes of South Korea
Territorial disputes of North Korea
Korea–United States relations
Korea–Soviet Union relations
North Korea–South Korea border
Partition (politics)
Aftermath of the Korean War
Allied occupation of Korea